Croston is a civil parish in the Borough of Chorley, Lancashire, England.   The parish contains 47 buildings that are recorded in the National Heritage List for England as designated listed buildings. Of these, one is listed at Grade II*, the middle grade, and the others are at Grade II, the lowest grade.  The parish contains the village of Croston, and this is surrounded by agricultural land.  Passing through the parish are the River Yarrow and the new cut of the River Douglas.  Most of the listed buildings are farmhouses, farm buildings, and houses, some of which originated as farmhouses.  The other listed buildings include churches, almshouses, a village cross, public houses, a school, bridges, a former rectory and associated structures, and a telephone kiosk.

Key

Buildings

References

Citations

Sources

Lists of listed buildings in Lancashire
Buildings and structures in the Borough of Chorley